Journeyman is a worker, skilled in a given building trade or craft, who has successfully completed an official apprenticeship qualification. Journeymen are considered competent and authorized to work in that field as a fully qualified employee. They earn their license by education, supervised experience and examination. Although journeymen have completed a trade certificate and are allowed to work as employees, they may not yet work as self-employed master craftsmen.

The term "journeyman" was originally used in the medieval trade guilds. Journeymen were paid daily and the word "journey" is derived from journée, meaning "whole day" in French. Each individual guild generally recognised three ranks of workers: apprentices, journeymen, and masters. A journeyman, as a qualified tradesman could become a master and run their own business, but most continued working as employees.

Guidelines were put in place to promote responsible tradesmen, who were held accountable for their own work and to protect the individual trade and the general public from unskilled workers. To become a master, a journeyman has to submit a master piece of work to a guild for evaluation. Only after evaluation can a journeyman be admitted to the guild as a master. Sometimes, a journeyman was required to accomplish a three-year working trip, which may be called the journeyman years.

Origin

The word journey comes from the French journée (day), which in turn comes from the Latin diurnus (pertaining to a day, daily). The title "journeyman" refers to the right to charge a fee for each day's work. A journeyman has completed an apprenticeship but is employed by another such as a master craftsman, but they would live apart and might have a family of their own. A journeyman could not employ others. In contrast, an apprentice would be bound to a master, usually for a fixed term of seven years, and lived with the master as a member of the household, receiving most or all compensation in the form of food, lodging, and training.

In parts of Europe, as in Late Medieval Germany, spending time as a wandering journeyman (Wandergeselle), moving from one town to another to gain experience of different workshops, was an important part of the training of an aspirant master. Carpenters and other artisans in German-speaking countries have retained the tradition of traveling journeymen even today, but only a few still practice it. In France, journeymen were known as compagnons.

Modern era
In modern apprenticeship systems, a journeyman has a trades certificate to show the required completion of an apprenticeship. In many countries, it is the highest formal rank, as that of master has been eliminated, and they may perform all tasks of the trade in the area certified as well as supervise apprentices and become self-employed.

The modern apprenticeship system aims to build skills by on-the-job training. An apprentice is able to earn a living while learning new skills. The working environment is closely linked to the employer giving the individual company the opportunity to shape the apprentice, within the guidelines, to suit particular requirements. Quite often, a strong working relationship is built between employee and employer.

In Germany, however, master craftsmen, after they complete their apprenticeships, are required to take part-time courses that last three to four years or full-time courses that last one year.

United States

In the United States, employment in some building trades, such as an electrician, carpenter, plumber, machinist, and HVAC contractor, usually requires holding state or local (city or county) license as a journeyman or master. The license certifies that the craftsman has met the requirements of time in the field (usually a minimum of 8,000 hours) and time in an approved classroom setting (usually 700 hours). A journeyman has the responsibility of supervising workers of lesser experience and training them and has the qualifications (knowledge and skills) to work unsupervised himself. A journeyman is commonly expected to have a wide range of experience, covering most fields of their trade. For example, a non-journeyman worker of some 20 or 30 years' experience may have most or all of their experience in only residential, commercial, or industrial applications. A journeyman, however, has a broad field of experience in residential, commercial, and industrial applications.

Australia
In Australia, a journeyman registration allows the permit holder to work under the general direction of an advanced tradesman. A journeyman may oversee the work of apprentices and trades assistants but may not contract for work using that particular registration. A journeyman level qualification is obtained by completing a formal apprenticeship. An apprenticeship is learning a skilled trade under the supervision of an advanced tradesperson. An apprentice is a trainee who is becoming formally trained and qualified in a particular type of trade. The duration of an apprenticeship is usually three to four years, depending on the individual trade. On completion of the training the apprentice will receive a nationally recognised qualification, a trade certificate. Practical on-the-job learning makes up the majority of an apprenticeship, but it also incorporates some classroom learning. Apprenticeships offer real-life experience in the workplace, a regular income and new skills. Examples of licensed trades are plumbers and gas-fitters, electricians, air-conditioning and refrigeration mechanics and carpenters and joiners.

Canada
In Canada, in addition to completion of Apprenticeship in a Skilled Trade, the worker may also choose to write an exam to be recognized throughout the country via the Interprovincial Standards Red Seal Program.

Modern journeyman
The modern journeyman is a term for the many paths of adult education and can be used to describe life's process of continual learning. Although the term journeyman is typically traditional, modern journeyman is also used to refer to current concepts of adult education: life-long learning, up-skilling, the knowledge wave and modern apprenticeships.

In American English, a journeyman is an athlete or employee in general who is technically competent but unable to excel. The term is used elsewhere (such as in British and Australian contexts) to refer to a professional sportsman who plays for numerous clubs during their career.

See also
 Air Force Occupational Badge
 Compagnons du Tour de France
 Journeyman papers
 Journeyman years (Waltz)
 Journeyman (boxing)
 Tradesperson
 Vocational education

Further reading
 George Sand: The journeyman joiner or The Compagnon of the tour de France. 1847 (in French: Le Compagnon du tour de France, 1840)

References

External links

 The modern Journeymen
 Taking it to the streets
 The Wander-Buch of Wilibald Koch

Vocational education
Apprenticeship